Zephyranthes sessilis is a species of flowering plant in the family Amaryllidaceae, native to central, northeastern and southwestern Mexico. It was first described by William Herbert in 1837.

References

sessilis
Flora of Central Mexico
Flora of Northeastern Mexico
Flora of Southwestern Mexico
Plants described in 1837